"Gelin Ayşe" also alternatively known as "Gelin Ayşem", "Koyun Gelir Yata Yata" and "Ayşemin Yeşil Sandığı" is a Turkish folkloric tune.

Lyrics
The lyrics of the song are a lament on the fate of the village bride Ayşe.

The word "Gelin" in Turkish and Gəlin in Azerbaijani means someone who has come into a family (like a bride for example). "Ayşe" is a Turkic female given name, an alternative of the Arabic name Aisha, famously the name of the second wife of Prophet Muhammed.

Famous versions

Many artists have interpreted the song. Cengiz Özkan recorded a version published by Kalan Müzik in 2005. Tülay German released a version that is included in her collections album Burçak Tarlasi 1962-1987. Ruhi Su recorded it as "Koyun Gelir Yata Yata". Gülşen Kutlu recorded it as "Ayşemin Yeşil Sandığı".

Notes
Ruhi Su version
Gelin Ayşe Ağıdı
Gelin Ayşe (Kara çadır eğmeyinen)
Gelin Ayşe (Kara çadır eğmeyinen)

References

External links
Tülay German - Gelin Ayşe'm
Modern Folk Üçlüsü-Gelin Ayşe
Alpay - Gelin Ayşe (Orijinal Plak Kayıt)
Cengiz Özkan - Gelin Ayşe [Gelin © 2005 Kalan Müzik ]
Yeşim Dağlı - Gelin Ayşe
Kıraç - Gelin Ayşe (Official Audio)
Gül Yazıcı (Alaturka Records) - Gelin Ayşe
Ruhi Su Koyun Gelir Yata Yata Gelin Ayşe
Ruhi Su Dostlar Korosu - Koyun Gelir Yata Yata
Gülşen Kutlu - Ayşemin Yeşil Sandığı
Refik Başaran - Koyun Gelir Yata Yata (Taş Plak Arşivi)

Turkish music
Turkish songs
Year of song unknown